William B. Travis High School, also known as Travis High School, is a public high school in Pecan Grove, Fort Bend County, Texas. Located off Grand Parkway and in Houston's extraterritorial jurisdiction, the school is Fort Bend Independent School District's (FBISD) 10th high school and the largest school by enrollment in the district. Opened in 2006, Travis holds a Richmond, Texas address although the school (nor the district) serve any part of the city. The school serves part of Pecan Grove, part of Aliana, and part of New Territory (in addition to the employee residences  of the nearby Jester State Prison Farm units). Travis is considered one of the most racially diverse public high schools in the state. 

The school's mascot is the tiger and the school colors are scarlet, gray, and white.

Travis hosts two of FBISD's high school academies: the Global Studies Academy (GSA) and the International Business and Marketing Academy (IBMA).

History
Travis High School is named after Texas pioneer William B. Travis. The campus opened on August 21, 2006 and received its dedication on October 15 of the same year. The opening of Travis relieved Austin High School and George Bush High School, with grades 9 and 10 immediately zoned to Travis, and grades 11 to 12 continuing to go to Austin with a phaseout of one grade per year. It became Fort Bend ISD's tenth high school.

In January 2022, more than 200 students at the school signed a petition urging FBISD to close schools in response to rising COVID-19 cases.

In the 2022-2023 school year, district administrators proposed new attendance boundaries to combat overcrowding at the school of more than 3,000 students. The plans include zoning all students from New Territory (which is currently split between Travis and Austin) to only Austin High School, and possibly transferring the two academies the school hosts to another high school in the district such as Kempner High School. The change was approved in February 2023.

The school's student council is known for bringing dogs in for stress relief dogs prior to exam week.

Campus 
Travis is located on Harlem Road, off Grand Parkway/SH 99 and surrounded by the Harvest Green neighborhood, a master-planned community by Johnson Development. Directly to the north across Harvest Corner Drive are a number of commercial shops, including Subway and Kung Fu Tea. Additional shops are to the east across Harlem, including an Exxon. 

The south half of the campus property contains many athletic facilities, including a turfed football field and track, a baseball field, a softball field, three practice fields, and 8 tennis courts, along with a fieldhouse.

Athletics 
Travis, as well as all other high schools in the district, have teams represented in every UIL sport except for wrestling. In the 2012-2013 school year, Travis was the UIL 5A basketball state champion.

Feeder patterns
The attendance boundary of the school include Pecan Grove, Aliana, New Territory, and the employee residences of some of the nearby Jester State Prison Farm units.

The following elementary schools feed into Travis:
 Brazos Bend Elementary
 Neill Elementary
 Pecan Grove Elementary
 Oakland Elementary
 Patterson Elementary (partial)
 Madden Elementary (partial)
 Malala Elementary (partial)

The following middle schools feed into Travis:
 Sartartia Middle School (partial)
 James Bowie Middle School
 Garcia Middle School (partial)
Under proposed changes, Brazos Bend Elementary and Sartartia Middle School would no longer feed into Travis, and some areas may attend Crockett Middle School instead of Bowie Middle School (but remain zoned to Travis.

Notable alumni
Andrew Harrison, former point guard for the University of Kentucky, current NBA player for the Cleveland Cavaliers.
Aaron Harrison, former shooting guard for the University of Kentucky, current NBA player for Delaware 87ers
Charcer Burks, current outfielder for Chicago Cubs minor league system
Nathan Bertness, current pitcher for Los Angeles Angels of Anaheim minor league system
Hakeem Butler, current wide receiver for the Arizona Cardinals and former receiver for Iowa State
 Steven Sims Jr., wide receiver and return specialist for the Washington Football Team and former receiver for the University of Kansas

References

External links

 Official website

Fort Bend Independent School District high schools
Educational institutions established in 2006
2006 establishments in Texas